George Hamilton (7 December 1917 – May 2001) was a Scottish international footballer, who spent most of his 21-year career with Aberdeen. He also played for Queen of the South, Heart of Midlothian and Hamilton Academical.

Playing career

Queen of the South

Born in Irvine, Hamilton started out with local junior side Irvine Meadow before moving to Dumfries to join Queen of the South. Hamilton was comfortable with the ball on either foot and had an obvious love of playing the game. After a single season with Queens (scoring nine goals in 31 league games) Aberdeen managed by Dave Halliday (another ex-Queen of the South player) purchased him for £3000 in April 1938.

Aberdeen

Hamilton would prove as shrewd a signing as Halliday would ever make as he would emerge as an inspirational player of real quality.

Like many of his contemporaries, Hamilton's career was significantly disrupted by the Second World War and, when League football in Scotland went into abeyance in 1939, he returned to his native Ayrshire. Eventually, temporary Regional Leagues were established, and, due to war-time travel restrictions, players would guest for local sides. This resulted in Hamilton turning out for first Ayr United, then Rangers between 1940 and 1945.

Hamilton returned to Aberdeen at the end of global hostilities and enjoyed his most successful period, lifting the transitional 1945–46 League Cup then scoring the winner in the 1947 Scottish Cup Final against Hibernian. Despite this, when Heart of Midlothian offered £8000 plus the younger Archie Kelly for his services in December 1947, the Reds considered it good value for a 30-year-old, and accepted.

Heart of Midlothian

After only 17 appearances (scoring six goals in thirteen league games) for Hearts, an unsettled Hamilton returned to Aberdeen.

Return to Aberdeen
In March 1950 Hamilton played in a titanic Scottish Cup quarter final tussle against former club Queen of the South, eventually losing 4–3 after being three goals up.

Despite Aberdeen's erratic league results, Hamilton helped the side to two further (losing) Scottish Cup Final appearances, in 1953 and 1954.

Age eventually caught up with Hamilton and he was transferred to Hamilton Academical in 1955, having largely watched from the sidelines as a young Dons side won the 1954–55 League title with the long serving Halliday still at the helm.

Hamilton Academical
Hamilton retired a matter of months after joining Academicals, not long after his 38th birthday. In his eleven league appearances for the club he scored two goals.

International career 
Hamilton's consistent good form in 1945–46 earned him a Scotland national team debut against Northern Ireland.

Hamilton twice earned an international recall, initially in 1951, when he scored a hat-trick against Belgium, then remarkably in 1954 when aged 36. He played two games against Norway, scoring the only goal of the game played in Scotland. This latter return coincided with the 1954 FIFA World Cup and Hamilton was selected in the 22-man squad for Switzerland. Scotland decided to take only 13 players to the finals, and Hamilton was initially one of the players told to stay at home on reserve. Bobby Johnstone then withdrew through injury, and Hamilton was called in to replace him in the 13-man squad. Hamilton did not play in either of Scotland's two games at the tournament.

Hamilton was the first former Queen of the South player to travel to the World Cup Finals. Sam Malcolmson to Spain in 1982 and Bernie Slaven at Italia 90 are the others to have done so.

Later years
After hanging up his boots, Hamilton joined the Aberdeen coaching team.

Career statistics

Club

International

Honours
Aberdeen 
 Scottish Cup: 1947
Southern League Cup (Scotland): 1946

See also
 List of Scotland national football team hat-tricks

References

External links
 George Hamilton full career profile on the official Queen of the South website
 
 Appearances at londonhearts.com

1917 births
2001 deaths
Footballers from Irvine, North Ayrshire
Scottish footballers
Scotland international footballers
Queen of the South F.C. players
Aberdeen F.C. players
Rangers F.C. wartime guest players
Ayr United F.C. wartime guest players
Heart of Midlothian F.C. players
Hamilton Academical F.C. players
Scottish Football League players
1954 FIFA World Cup players
Aberdeen F.C. non-playing staff
Scottish Football League representative players
Association football inside forwards
Irvine Meadow XI F.C. players
Scotland wartime international footballers